Pare (Kipare), also known as Asu (Casu, Chasu, Athu, Chathu), is a Northeast Coast Bantu language spoken by the Pare people of Tanzania.

References

Northeast Coast Bantu languages